Meteoro Amplifiers is a Brazilian amplifier brand, established 1985.

Its products are famous among Brazilian bands like Sepultura, Titãs, Paralamas do Sucesso, Natiruts, O Rappa, RPM, Pitty, Bruno e Marrone, Capital Inicial, IRA and many others. In 2003, Meteoro won a contest for the best Brazilian brand of amplifiers and afterwards competed with international brands like Marshall, Mesa/Boogie and Vox. Today, Meteoro is working to expand their sales in other countries.

Audio amplifier manufacturers
Electronics companies of Brazil
Audio equipment manufacturers of Brazil
Brazilian brands